"Crack a Bottle" is a song by American rappers Eminem, Dr. Dre and 50 Cent. The song was released as the lead single from the former's sixth studio album Relapse (2009). On February 12, 2009, the song broke the first week digital sales record with 418,000 downloads, topping the previous record held by "Live Your Life" by T.I. featuring Rihanna. This record was broken again the following week by "Right Round" by Flo Rida. The song won the Grammy Award for Best Rap Performance by a Duo or Group in 2010.

Background
"Crack a Bottle" initially gained attention in December 2008, when an unfinished version of the song was initially leaked under the name "Number One" on the mixtape 4th Quarter Pressure Part 2, while a final working version was leaked on January 6, 2009. Various media outlets had reported that the recording was to be the first single from Eminem's 2009 album Relapse, however the Italian branch of Universal Music Group, owner of Interscope Records, later denied this, stating that "Crack a Bottle" was only a promotional recording. Despite all this, the song was released on February 2, 2009, and made available for paid digital download, with 50 Cent stating that the song will be included on his upcoming album Before I Self Destruct. According to Danielle Harling of HipHopDX—a website dedicated to hip hop music coverage—the song will ultimately be present on both Relapse and Before I Self Destruct, while in contrast, Daniel Kreps of Rolling Stone Magazine stated that it is still unsure which rapper will feature this song on his upcoming album. Despite the confusion, Universal eventually announced that "Crack a Bottle" would be included in Relapse exclusively, although it did not consider it the album's first single. The song samples "Mais dans la lumière" by Mike Brant, written by Jean Renard, who also received songwriting credits for the song. The same sample is used in the song Preservation by Aesop Rock and Del tha Funkee Homosapien, found on Wu-Tang Clan's 2005 album Wu-Tang Meets the Indie Culture. The song is in the key of C-sharp minor. American rapper Jay Rock released a remix to the song. Rappers Cashis and Bobby Creekwater were featured in the official remix of "Crack a Bottle". Rick Ross also released a remix as a diss to G-Unit.

Critical reception
Billboard gave a positive review of the song: "Although not quite as strong as the title track to Eminem's 2004 album Encore, the return of Eminem, Dr. Dre and 50 Cent has been anticipated for a long time, and it is sure to put Eminem back atop the marquee. His skills remain some of the best in hip-hop, and the accompanying contributions make the music that little bit more stronger." Rolling Stone Magazine commented negatively on the song, saying that it is one of the weakest tracks on the album, along the other single "We Made You". The song won at the 52nd Grammy Awards in the Grammy Award for Best Rap Performance by a Duo or Group category.

Music video
During an interview for MTV, 50 Cent originally told that there were plans to make an animated music video for "Crack a Bottle", which was to be shot along with a music video for 50 Cent's song "I Get It In". On February 25, Eminem's manager Paul Rosenberg posted on his blog a still frame from the music video illustrating a homeless person holding a bottle wrapped in a brown bag. According to Rosenberg, it is directed by Syndrome and was planned to be released within a couple of weeks. The music video was playing on TV in Eminem's music video "3 a.m.", which has been directed by Syndrome as well. On May 7, 2009, an unfinished version of the video was released via TheRelapse.com, featuring Eminem's verse and chorus. Later during the same day, 50 Cent's rapped verse of the video was released via ThisIs50.com as well. This was added to the unfinished video on therelapse.com. A month later, on June 7, 2009, Cashis posted a link on Twitter to the full video in which he makes a cameo appearance. The music video portrays each rappers' style; Eminem's chaotic style, Dr. Dre's West Coast style, and 50 Cent's more club oriented style. None of the performers are featured in the video. On August 1, 2022, the official music video was released on YouTube after 13 years.

Awards and nominations

Track listing
Digital download

Promotional CD single

Chart performance
Since its release, "Crack a Bottle" has charted mainly in the United States, entering various charts including the Billboard Hot 100 and Hot R&B/Hip-Hop Songs. The song peaked in the top ten on the Hot Rap Tracks,  reaching number four. After spending three consecutive weeks at number seventy-eight on the Hot 100, on Billboard's edition of February 21, 2009, "Crack a Bottle" reached the number one position on the Hot 100 due to sales of 418,000 downloads, becoming the fourth-biggest jump to the top of the Hot 100 in the chart's history. "Crack a Bottle" is Eminem's second song to peak the top the Billboard Hot 100 since "Lose Yourself", which it peaked number one in 2002 and 2003 for twelve weeks. With this song, Dr. Dre reached the top of the Hot 100 for a third time while this is 50 Cent's fourth. The song has also entered in various European national charts, including the Irish Singles Chart and UK Singles Chart, and also debuted at number one on the Canadian Hot 100, which was the first number one debut on the chart.

Charts

Weekly charts

Year-end charts

Certifications

See also 
 Grammy Award for Best Rap Performance by a Duo or Group
 List of Hot 100 number-one singles of 2009 (U.S.)
 List of Hot 100 number-one singles of 2009 (Canada)
 List of UK R&B Singles Chart number ones of 2009
 List of Romanian Singles Chart top 10 Singles in 2009

References

2009 songs
2009 singles
Eminem songs
Dr. Dre songs
50 Cent songs
Billboard Hot 100 number-one singles
Canadian Hot 100 number-one singles
Songs written by Eminem
Songs written by Dr. Dre
Songs written by 50 Cent
Songs written by Mark Batson
Song recordings produced by Dr. Dre
Songs about alcohol
Shady Records singles
Aftermath Entertainment singles
Interscope Records singles
Songs written by Jean Renard (songwriter)
Songs written by Dawaun Parker